Rabbi Boruch of Medzhybizh (1753–1811), was a grandson of the Baal Shem Tov.
Reb Boruch (known in his childhood as Reb Boruch'l, a Yiddish diminutive, and subsequently as Reb Boruch'l HaKadosh) was the first major "rebbe" of the Hasidic movement to hold court in Mezhbizh in his grandfather's hometown and Beis Medrash, which he inherited.

Biography
As recorded in the early Hasidic work Mekor Boruch (first published in 1880 from handwritten manuscripts), at the time of the Baal Shem Tov's death, Rabbi Pinchas of Korets and Rabbi Jacob Joseph of Polonoye, two of the Baal Shem Tov's closest disciples, reported to the Hasidim that the Baal Shem Tov had designated Reb Boruch as his successor, and instructed Reb Pinchas to take responsibility to carry out those wishes. Reb Boruch was only seven at the time of his grandfather's death, and was raised in Reb Pinchas' home, where the Baal Shem Tov's other close disciples and other leaders of the Hasidic movement visited regularly to check on his progress and assist with his preparation to assume his grandfather's mantle.

Reb Boruch remained with Reb Pinchas of Korets until the Chevraya Kadisha, as the close inner circle of disciples of the Baal Shem Tov was known, felt that he was ready to become a Rebbe and return to Mezhbizh.

Rabbi Boruch'l was appointed rebbe around 1782. He conducted his court with the principle of malkhus (royalty). He conducted his court in Tulchyn from 1788 until 1800, after which he moved to Mezhbizh. There he built a spacious, luxurious residence where he had a coach and horses in his stable.

Many of his grandfather's disciples and the great Hasidic leaders of the time, regularly visited the Rebbe Reb Boruch'l as he was called, including the Magid of Chernobyl, the Magid of Mezritch, Rabbi Shneur Zalman of Lyadi (founder of the Chabad Hasidic movement), the Chozeh of Lublin, and others.

Reb Boruch was known for his melancholy, fiery temper, and uncompromising strong will. His guiding principle of malkhus was the subject of great debate amongst the Chasidic leadership of his generation. Reb Boruch was the first chasidic leader to accumulate great wealth from his devotees through the practice of petek and pidyonot. In other words, he obtained donations and gifts for personal requests or prayers. He claimed to his followers that he had supernatural powers derived directly from his blood-connection to the Baal Shem Tov.

In 1808, Rabbi Shneur Zalman of Lyadi visited Reb Boruch in Medzhybizh to settle their differences. At the time, Reb Boruch was incensed by his publication Tanya, and by Rabbi Shneur Zalman's insistence that communal funds be given freely to charitable causes. There are numerous stories related to this visit, most ending with Reb Boruch's temper getting the best of him. The visit ultimately resulted in Rabbi Shneur Zalman and his followers being evicted from Podolia.

In his later years, Reb Boruch became overwhelmed by his melancholy. In an attempt to remedy his melancholy, his followers brought in Hershel of Ostropol as a court jester of sorts. Hershel was one of the first documented Jewish comics and his exploits are legendary within both the Jewish and non-Jewish communities. One story has it that in a fit of rage Reb Boruch himself was responsible for Hershel's death. At least one tale has Hershel lingering for several days and dying in Reb Boruch's own bed surrounded by Reb Boruch and his followers.

When Reb Boruch died in 1811 on 18 Kislev 5572, his chasidim (followers) numbered in the thousands. He is buried in the Jewish cemetery in Medzhybizh, next to his grandfather the Baal Shem Tov. His writings were included in Amarot Tehorot published in 1865 and in Buzino Dinhora published in 1879.

See also 
 Baal Shem Tov
 Baal Shem Tov family tree
 Hershel of Ostropol
 Medzhybizh
 Medzhibozh (Hasidic dynasty)
 Rapoport-Bick (rabbinic dynasty)

References

Bibliography 
 Chapin, David A. and Weinstock, Ben, The Road from Letichev: The history and culture of a forgotten Jewish community in Eastern Europe, Volume 1.  iUniverse, Lincoln, NE, 2000.
 Wiesel, Elie, 1978, Four Hasidic masters and their struggle against melancholy:  University of Notre Dame Press.
 Rabinowicz, Tzvi M. The Encyclopedia of Hasidism:  Jason Aronson, Inc., 1996.
 Tracing An-sky:  Uitgeverij Waaders b.v., Zwolle, State Ethnographic Museum, St. Petersburg, Joods Historisch Museum, Amsterdam, 1992.

1753 births
1811 deaths
People from Medzhybizh
Descendants of the Baal Shem Tov
Hasidic rebbes
Rabbis from the Russian Empire